Francis "Bull" McCaffrey (December 26, 1888 – December 26, 1952) was an  American football player and coach. McCaffrey was the co-head football coach at Fordham University with Frank Gargan for one season, in 1917, and compiled a record of 7–2. McCaffrey was also the head football coach of Erasmus Hall High School in Brooklyn and DeWitt Clinton High School in the Bronx.

McCaffrey graduated from Fordham in 1911, where he starred in football and baseball. A 5'8", 165-pound end, he earned the nickname "Bull" for his aggressive playing style. He was Fordham's first-ever All-America selection when in 1909, his junior season, when Walter Camp chose him as one of the college football's premier players. Fordham discontinued football before McCaffrey's senior season in 1910, so Princeton University offered him a football scholarship. McCaffrey did not accept the scholarship because his mother thought that football was too rough and she did not want to see him get hurt, which had been a concern of hers while McCaffrey played for Fordham.

After graduating from the New York University College of Dentistry, McCaffrey practiced oral surgery in New York City. He was the chief of the dental clinic at Fordham Hospital and an associate professor at Columbia University. McCaffrey died on his 64th birthday, December 26, 1952,  at his home in The Bronx. His son, Francis J. McCaffrey Jr. was a New York State legislator.

Head coaching record

College

References

1888 births
1952 deaths
American dentists
American football ends
Columbia University faculty
Fordham Rams baseball players
Fordham Rams football coaches
Fordham Rams football players
High school football coaches in New York (state)
New York University College of Dentistry alumni
Sportspeople from the Bronx
Players of American football from New York City
Coaches of American football from New York (state)
Baseball players from New York (state)
20th-century dentists